Desulfovibrio idahonensis is a bacterium. It contains c-type cytochromes and reduces sulfate, sulfite, thiosulfate, elemental sulfur, DMSO, anthraquinone disulfonate and fumarate. The type strain is CY1T (=DSM 15450T =JCM 14124T).

References

Further reading
Staley, James T., et al. "Bergey's manual of systematic bacteriology, vol. 3."Williams and Wilkins, Baltimore, MD (1989): 2250–2251. *Bélaich, Jean-Pierre, Mireille Bruschi, and Jean-Louis Garcia, eds. Microbiology and biochemistry of strict Anaerobes Involved in interspecies hydrogen transfer. No. 54. Springer, 1990.

External links
LPSN

Type strain of Desulfovibrio idahonensis at BacDive -  the Bacterial Diversity Metadatabase

Bacteria described in 2009
Desulfovibrio